Olszowa  is a village in the administrative district of Gmina Ujazd, within Strzelce County, Opole Voivodeship, in south-western Poland.

The village has a population of 350.

External links 
 Jewish Community in Olszowa on Virtual Shtetl

References

Olszowa